Carn Brea Village is a village in the civil parish of Carn Brea (where the 2011 census population is included), Cornwall, England, UK. It is south of the railway line to Penzance while Tolskithy is to the north.

References

Villages in Cornwall